Al-Khair University is a private university located in Azad Kashmir, Pakistan. It was established under Act No. XXVIII of the Legislative Assembly of Azad Jammu & Kashmir in 1994.

Al-Khair University (AJK)
The University was established under Act No. XXVIII of the Legislative Assembly of Azad Jammu & Kashmir in 1994 and recognized by the Higher Education Commission (HEC), Govt. of Pakistan. The Higher Education Commission attests Al-Khair University (AJK) students' degrees. The Main objective for the establishment of the University in the Private Sector was to supplement Public Sector Education, by disseminating professional, scientific, and technological education in the Country. With a view, however, to keep pace with changing scenario of education globally, the main focus is in the field of Marketing, Banking & Finance, Information Technology, and Computer Oriented courses.

The Commission bans admissions to Al-Khair University (AJK), Accordingly, no admission is offered to any program. 

 <ref>

References

Private universities and colleges in Pakistan
Educational institutions established in 1994
1994 establishments in Pakistan
Bhimber District